Robert "Bob" Hartley (born September 7, 1960) is a Canadian professional ice hockey coach. He most recently served as the head coach of Avangard Omsk of the Kontinental Hockey League (KHL). He has additionally coached the Latvia men's national ice hockey team. He coached the Colorado Avalanche from 1998–2002 and won the Stanley Cup in 2001. He also coached the Atlanta Thrashers from the 2003–04 season up until the beginning of the 2007–08 season, when he was fired after the Thrashers got off to an 0–6 start. From 2012 to 2016, Hartley was the head coach of the Calgary Flames. Hartley was an ice hockey analyst for the French-language RDS television channel until 2011, when he became the head coach of the ZSC Lions of the Swiss National League A.

Early years
Bob Hartley never played a game in the NHL, instead beginning his coaching career with a junior A team in his hometown of Hawkesbury. After guiding the team to a championship, his accolades caught the eye of the Laval Titan of the Quebec Major Junior Hockey League (QMJHL). While Hartley was coaching the junior A Hawkesbury Hawks, he worked full-time as an assembly line worker at PPG Industries in Hawkesbury.

Coaching career

Laval Titan
Hartley's tenure as the Laval Titan head coach was marked with success. He recorded an 81–52–7 record in two seasons with the team. In his second season as the team's head coach, he guided the team to a Memorial Cup participation in 1993.

American Hockey League
Hartley was hired as an assistant coach of the American Hockey League (AHL)'s Cornwall Aces under Jacques Martin. When Martin was appointed assistant coach of the parent Quebec Nordiques, Hartley was promoted to head coach and guided the Aces to two division titles during the team's three-year history. When the relocated Nordiques, now known as the Colorado Avalanche, became affiliated with the Hershey Bears, Hartley followed the team and was named head coach of the Bears. Hartley's tenure with the Bears was a success as he guided the team to four consecutive playoff appearances and a Calder Cup title in 1997.

Colorado Avalanche
Hartley's success with the Bears caught the eye of then-Avalanche general manager Pierre Lacroix, who was looking for a replacement for Marc Crawford, who had suddenly resigned after a surprising first round playoff exit. Hartley was hired as the team's second head coach since the relocation to Denver on June 2, 1998. In his first season with the Avalanche, the team got off to a 2–1–6 start, the mediocre start prompted skeptics to question the hiring. When the team caught fire in mid-December, they won their first Northwest Division title and fifth-straight overall. During the 1999 Stanley Cup playoffs, the team defeated the San Jose Sharks in the first round and halted the Detroit Red Wings quest for a three-peat before bowing to the eventual Stanley Cup champion Dallas Stars in the Western Finals. Hartley's second season saw the team win their sixth consecutive division title along with playoff victories over the Phoenix Coyotes and a rematch with the Red Wings before bowing to the defending champion Dallas in the Western Final for the second consecutive year.

Hartley's third season was ultimately his most successful one. Motivated by Ray Bourque's desire to win a Stanley Cup championship, the Avalanche coasted through the league with a 52–16–10–4 record, a seventh consecutive division title along with the Presidents' Trophy. The playoffs began with a first round sweep of the eighth seed Vancouver Canucks before enduring a seven-game scare by the Los Angeles Kings in the Western Semi-Finals before taking down the St. Louis Blues in five games, setting up a Stanley Cup Finals matchup with the Eastern Conference's top seed, the New Jersey Devils. After falling behind three games to two in the series, the Avalanche rallied back to win the Stanley Cup, accomplishing Bourque's goal and making it the second-straight year the defending champions had lost in the finals, as the Devils themselves defeated the 1999 champion Dallas Stars the year prior.

Another notable milestone from the 2000–01 NHL season for Hartley included coaching the North American All-Star team to a 14–11 victory on home ice. Hartley brought the Stanley Cup to his hometown of Hawkesbury, bringing the trophy to the PPG Industries plant he worked at. The following season, the team won their eighth consecutive division title and looked sharp in their quest for a second consecutive Stanley Cup. At the start of the playoffs, Hartley became the first head coach since Billy Reay to guide his teams to four consecutive conference final appearances. After two grueling playoff series victories over the Los Angeles Kings and San Jose Sharks, in a repeat of the 1997 Western Finals, the team bowed to the archrival Detroit Red Wings, who would go on to win the Stanley Cup. Hartley's tenure with the Avalanche ended on December 17, 2002, when the team endured a 10–8–9–4 start and he was replaced by assistant coach Tony Granato. Hartley left the Avalanche franchise with a 193–109–48 regular season record and a 49–31 playoff record. His 193 wins were the most in the Colorado portion of franchise history at the time. He became the only coach in team history to record 40 or more wins during his first four seasons as head coach.

Atlanta Thrashers
One month after being fired by the Avalanche, Hartley was appointed as the second full-time head coach of the Atlanta Thrashers, who were looking for a replacement after original head coach Curt Fraser was fired following an 8–20–4–1 start on January 15, 2003. Hartley immediately went to work on the team's fortunes. The team went 20–14–5–1 down the stretch and were in the playoff race for the second half of the season, giving hope to Thrasher fans. Hartley's first full season behind the Atlanta bench began with tragedy following the death of Dan Snyder and loss of Dany Heatley for the majority of the season. The team overcame the adversity and set new franchise records for wins and points in a single season with a 33–37–8–4 record. Under Hartley's guidance, rising star Ilya Kovalchuk became a tri-winner of the Maurice "Rocket" Richard Trophy. Following the 2004–05 NHL lockout, the Thrashers endured yet another slow start and multiple injuries at the goaltending position. After original goaltenders Kari Lehtonen and Mike Dunham were injured, Hartley was forced to use prospects Adam Berkhoel and Michael Garnett along with journeyman Steve Shields, the Thrashers posted the first winning season in franchise history with a 41–33–8 record, but fell short for a playoff appearance after losing out to the Tampa Bay Lightning in the final week of the regular season by two points. The 2006–07 NHL season was one of many accomplishments for the young Thrashers under Hartley's guidance. The team won their first Southeast Division title, setting new franchise records for wins and points with a 43–28–11 record, good enough for 97 points and third seed in the Eastern Conference. The team also clinched its first playoff berth in franchise history and played the New York Rangers in the first round. As of April 16, 2007, Hartley is the all-time winningest coach in franchise history. On October 17, 2007, Hartley was fired and was temporarily replaced by Don Waddell, the general manager at the time. Hartley was under fire because the team had yet to register a point in six regular season games, was 30th and 27th in the NHL in goals for and against, respectively.

ZSC Lions
On March 14, 2011, Hartley signed a two-year contract to coach the ZSC Lions, replacing former Sweden national team head coach Bengt-Åke Gustafsson. On April 17, 2012, Hartley led ZSC Lions to a Game 7 upset victory against favourite SC Bern to claim the Swiss championship. Hartley then used his escape clause to return to the NHL and was replaced as Lions head coach by Marc Crawford, the man he had replaced as Avalanche head coach in 1998.

Calgary Flames
On May 31, 2012, Hartley returned to the NHL as head coach of the Calgary Flames. On June 24, 2015, Hartley won the Jack Adams Award as the NHL's coach of the year. He was the first coach in Flames franchise history to win the award. He was fired on May 3, 2016, less than one year after receiving the award, but achieving a 134–135–25 record and one playoff appearance over his four seasons in Calgary.

Latvian national team
On December 20, 2016, the Latvian Ice Hockey Federation announced that Hartley agreed to become the head coach of Latvia national team.

Avangard Omsk
On May 27, 2018, he was appointed head coach of Avangard Omsk, playing in the Kontinental Hockey League. He signed a contract with Avangard for a period of two years. He brought the team to the final of the Gagarin Cup, in which the club from Omsk lost in four matches to CSKA Moscow.

On April 28, 2021, while remaining the head coach of Avangard, he won the Gagarin Cup.

Personal life
Hartley and his wife Micheline have one daughter, Kristine, and one son, Steve.

Despite his anglophone-sounding name, Hartley is a Franco-Ontarian. French is his first language; his English has a marked French accent.

Coaching record

Championships
 Gagarin Cup - 2021
 Stanley Cup – 2001
 Calder Cup – 1997
 NLA champion – 2012

See also
 List of NHL head coaches

References

External links
 

1960 births
Living people
Atlanta Thrashers coaches
Calgary Flames coaches
Colorado Avalanche coaches
Franco-Ontarian people
Hershey Bears coaches
Jack Adams Award winners
Latvia men's national ice hockey team coaches
Laval Titan coaches
Ottawa Senators announcers
People from Hawkesbury, Ontario
Stanley Cup champions
Stanley Cup championship-winning head coaches